Eucosma lacteana is a moth belonging to the family Tortricidae. The species was first described by Treitschke in 1835.

It is native to Europe.

References

Eucosmini